is a Japanese tarento and half-pipe snowboarder.

Imai's father is snowboarding coach Takashi Narita, and she has two brothers: former snowboarder Dome Narita and trampoliner Grim Narita.

She gave up snowboarding after the 2006 Winter Olympics and became a television presenter, then a nude model appearing in several gravure DVD's. In 2017 she had a short career as pornographic film actress and in 2018 announced a return to snowboarding. The same year she won the All Japan Snowboarding Championships, greatly outpacing the competition with an overwhelming win and only 4 days of training for the event.

Early life

From the age of 7, Imai's father, snowboarding coach Takashi Narita, trained her and her brother Dome in snowboarding.  They trained up to 18 hours a day, and when they finished high school, he had them forgo post-secondary education to focus on snowboarding.  Imai has said she envied others her age for being able to lead ordinary lives, and at one point attempted to take her life by slashing her wrists.

Early snowboarding career

Imai specialized in the half-pipe.  She participated in the 2006 Winter Olympics in Turin, Italy, but came in last after severely injuring herself.  Upon her return to Japan, she suffered public humiliation, with commenters calling her "a waste of tax money" and "a national embarrassment".  She later stated, "For many athletes, the Olympics are the peak of their career, but for me it was a nightmare."  She suffered from depression, and gave up the sport.

Career in the sex industry, nude modelling and AV career

After leaving the sport, Imai supported herself over the years by working in bars, and soon became a hostess and then an escort, working three days at a sex parlor.  She moved on to appearing in television programs as a tarento and as a nude model in pornographic magazines. Between 2014 and 2016 she appeared in over a dozen nude gravure DVD's, a genre of softcore pornography, all of them being produced by the company Kingdom.  In 2017 she made her hardcore pornographic video début in Snow Drop and Snow Out. Both movies were released by Muteki, an AV company specializing in making the adult film debuts of gravure idols and minor celebrities. Upon being asked why she didn't maintain a longer career in AV, Imai said that she was more interested in returning to snowboarding and "didn't wanted to overdo it in AV".

Return to snowboarding

Imai returned to snowboarding in 2017, and won gold at the All Japan Snowboarding Championships in 2018.

Personal life

Imai has a son and daughter, whom she has raised as a single mother.  Imai has stated she is not embarrassed by her past in pornography, as she did it voluntarily out of the need for money, and considers herself to have been a good mother who did everything to support her children.

Main results

Filmography

TV drama

Bibliography

Photo albums

DVD

See also
Japan at the 2006 Winter Olympics

References

Works cited

External links
WWS Channel interview 
 

Japanese actresses
Japanese female adult models
Japanese female snowboarders
Olympic snowboarders of Japan
Snowboarders at the 2006 Winter Olympics
People from Osaka
1987 births
Living people